Jawan may refer to:

Jawan, a term of Persian origin, meaning "young" in several South Asian languages
 A junior soldier (especially an infantryman) in South Asia; this term usually covers all ranks below that of a commissioned officer in India and Pakistan
 Jawan Jamison (born 1991), American football player
 Jawan Sikandarpur, a village block and nagar panchayat in Uttar Pradesh, India
 Jawan Vajidpur, a village in Uttar Pradesh, India
 Djaouan, 7th-century fortress in Kaouar
 Jawan (film), an upcoming Bollywood action film

See also 
 Jawan Bakht (disambiguation), list of people with the name
 Jai Jawan Jai Kisan, an Indian slogan by former Prime Minister Lal Bahadur Shastri that means "hail the soldier, hail the farmer"
Jai Jawaan Jai Kisaan (film), a 2015 film about Lal Bahadur Shastri
 Javan (disambiguation)
 Jawa (disambiguation)

Urdu-language words and phrases